Carlos Ibargüen may refer to:

 Carlos Ibargüen (footballer, born 1990), Colombian former football forward for La Equidad and Veracruz
 Carlos Ibargüen (footballer, born 1995), Colombian football forward for Técnico Universitario